NCNA can refer to:

 Xinhua News Agency (New China News Agency)
 National Council for a New America